Brussels Jazz Orchestra is a Belgian jazz orchestra with big band line up founded in 1993 by saxophonist and composer Frank Vaganée, Serge Plume, Marc Godfroid and Bo van der Werf. Since 1999 the orchestra is supported by the Flemish government.

Since then it has established a reputation both at home and on relevant jazz stages abroad: Jazz Middelheim (Antwerp, Belgium), Jazz at Lincoln Center (New York, U.S.), Concertgebouw Amsterdam (Netherlands), Jazz à Vienne (France), Paris Jazz Festival (France) and many others.

BJO has performed with Philip Catherine, Bert Joris, Royal Flemish Philharmonic, Tutu Puoane, Brussels Philharmonic, David Linx and Richard Galliano in its own productions. BJO invited Joe Lovano (US), Maria Schneider (US), Kenny Werner (US), Dave Liebman (US), Dave Douglas (US), Gianluigi Trovesi (IT), McCoy Tyner (US), Maria João (PT), Kenny Wheeler (GB), Lee Konitz (US), Toots Thielemans, Enrico Pieranunzi (I) and others.

Awards and honors
 Best Traditional Jazz Album, South African Music Award, Mama Africa, 2011
 Zilveren Griffel (NL) for audiobook Vliegen tot de hemel, 2011. BJO composed and performed the original soundtrack
 Golden Globe, BAFTA, César, and Academy Award for soundtrack The Artist, 2011–2012 
 Grammy Award nomination, Best Large Jazz Ensemble Album, Wild Beauty, 2013
 Edison Jazz/World Award, best "Vocal Jazz" album for BREL, 2017

Members
 Trumpets: Serge Plume, Nico Schepers, Pierre Drevet, Jeroen Van Malderen
 Trombones: Marc Godfroid, Lode Mertens, Ben Fleerakkers, Frederik Heirman, Laurent Hendrick
 Saxophones: Frank Vaganée, Dieter Limbourg, Kurt Van Herck, Bart Defoort, Bo Van Der Werf
 Acoustic bass: Bart De Nolf
 Piano: Nathalie Loriers
 Drums: Toni Vitacolonna

Discography
 Live (1997)
 The September Sessions (1999)
 The Music of Bert Joris (2002)
 Kenny Werner Plays His Music With The Brussels Jazz Orchestra (2003)
 Meeting Colours - with Philip Catherine (2005)
 Countermove (2006)
 Dangerous Liaison - Bert Joris with deFilharmonie (2006)
 Changing Faces - with David Linx (Oct. 2007)
 The Music of Michel Herr (Feb. 2008)
 JazzOlympics (2 tracks, including 1 with David Linx/Michel Herr) (July 2008)
 Ten Years Ago - with Richard Galliano (2008)
 Mama Africa - with Tutu Puoane (2010)
 Signs and Signatures - with Bert Joris (2010)
 Guided Dream - with Dave Liebman (2011)
 A Different Porgy & Another Bess - with David Linx and Maria João (2012)
 BJO's Finest - Live! (2013)
 Wild Beauty - with Joe Lovano (2013)
 The Music of Enrico Pieranunzi - with Enrico Pieranunzi (2015)
 BREL - with David Linx (2016)
 Two Small Bags, Ten Million Dreams - Artists #withRefugees - Frank Vaganée, Michael De Cock  with I Solisti del Vento, Brussels Vocal Project, David Linx, Tutu Puoane, Brussels Jazz Orchestra (2016)
 Smooth Shake with Bert Joris (2016)
 We Have A Dream - with Tutu Puoane (2018)

References
 Official website
 BJO on Soundcloud
 BJO on Youtube
 BJO on Spotify

Big bands
Belgian jazz ensembles
Musical groups established in 1993
1993 establishments in Belgium